The Waste Minimisation Act is an Act of Parliament passed in New Zealand in 2008.

It was a Private Members Bill introduced by Nándor Tánczos. The major provisions of the Act are: a levy on landfill waste, promoting product stewardship schemes, some mandatory waste reporting, clarifying the role of territorial authorities with respect to waste minimisation, and sets up a Waste Advisory Board.

The Act has a provision where the Minister for the Environment can assign the status of priority product, which are those that can cause a high degree of environmental harm.

See also
Waste in New Zealand
Environment of New Zealand
List of Statutes of New Zealand

References

External links
Text of the Act
Ministry for the Environment - Waste Minimisation Act information page
Briefing on the Waste Minimisation Bill by the Parliamentary Commissioner for the Environment

News

Waste in New Zealand
Statutes of New Zealand
Environmental law in New Zealand
2008 in New Zealand law
2008 in the environment
Waste minimisation